Claude Meunier  (born September 4, 1951) is a Canadian actor, dramaturge, comedian and film director.

Meunier was born in Montreal, Quebec and studied law at the Université de Montréal.

Filmography

Author

Television
 1976 - La Fricassée
 1976 - Bye Bye 76
 1981 - Bonne année Roger
 1982 - Le Bye Bye
 1983 - Les Lundis des Ha! Ha!
 1987 - Les Voisins
 1992 - Le monde merveilleux de Ding et Dong
 1993 to 1998 - La Petite Vie
 1999 - La Petite Vie : Le Bogue de l'an 2000
 2002 - La Petite Vie : Noël chez les Paré
 2005 - Détect.inc.
 2009 - La Petite Vie : Noël Story
 2012 - Adam & Ève (TV series)

Cinema
 1990 -  Ding et Dong, le film d'Alain Chartrand
 2008 -  Honey, I'm in Love (Le Grand Départ) de Claude Meunier

Actor

Television
 1981 - Bonne année Roger : multiple roles
 1982 - Le Bye Bye : multiple roles
 1983 - Les Lundis des Ha! Ha! : Dong
 1992 - Le monde merveilleux de Ding et Dong : Dong
 1993 to 1998 - La Petite Vie : Aimé (or « Ti-Mé ») Popa Paré
 1995 - Bye Bye 95 : multiple roles
 1999 - La Petite Vie : Le Bogue de l'an 2000 : Aimé (ou « Ti-Mé ») Popa Paré
 2002 - La Petite Vie : Noël chez les Paré : Aimé (ou « Ti-Mé ») Popa Paré
 2005 - Détect.inc. : Bob Marlow
 2009 - La Petite Vie : Noël Story : Aimé (ou « Ti-Mé ») Popa Paré
 2011 - La petite séduction : invited artist (visit of Sainte-Flore in Shawinigan)

Cinema
 1990 -  Ding et Dong, le film d'Alain Chartrand : Dong
 2008 -  Honey, I'm in Love (Le Grand Départ) de Claude Meunier : le voisin senteux

Film director

Cinéma
 2008 -  Honey, I'm in Love (Le Grand Départ)

Theatre (author)
 1974 - Les Nerfs à l'air
 1979 - Broue
 1981 - Appelez-moi Stéphane
 1982 - Les Voisins
 1982 - Monogamy
 2003 - Les Noces de tôle

Bibliography 
 1982 - Les Voisins, Leméac
 1998 - Le Monde de La Petite Vie, Leméac
 2000 - Journal d'un Ti-Mé : propos et réflexions, Leméac
 2003 - Les Noces de tôle, Leméac
 2009 - La bande à Ti-Paul, Glénat Québec (comic book)
 2011 - Les aventures de Fonck et Ponck : Les Voyageurs du Graal de Luca Jalbert, Cabro* Productions (comic book) (cameo of characters from the La Petite Vie television series)

External links

Living people
1951 births
Male actors from Montreal
Université de Montréal alumni
Comedians from Montreal
Film directors from Montreal
Canadian male film actors
20th-century Canadian dramatists and playwrights
21st-century Canadian dramatists and playwrights
Writers from Montreal
Dramaturges
Canadian dramatists and playwrights in French
Canadian male dramatists and playwrights
20th-century Canadian male writers
21st-century Canadian male writers
Officers of the Order of Canada